Kanyakumari may refer to:

 Kanyakumari (town) (or Cape Comorin), a town in South India 
 Kanyakumari District, a district of Tamil Nadu state in South India
 Kanyakumari Wildlife Sanctuary, one of the  Protected areas of Tamil Nadu
 Devi Kanya Kumari, the Devi, a Hindu Goddess
 A. Kanyakumari, a female Carnatic music violinist from Chennai
Devi Kanyakumari (film), Indian Malayalam film released in 1974
 Kanyakumari, Indian Malayalam film released in 1974